is a town in Fremont County, Wyoming, United States.  The population was 231 at the 2010 census.

History

Fracking and water quality
In 2008, rural residents five miles east-northeast of  complained of discolored water, foul smells and illness that they suspected was due to fracking, and the EPA opened an investigation. In 2010, the EPA investigators warned the affected rural residents not to drink their water after finding benzene, naphthalene, phenols, and metals in the water and recommended that the affected rural residents use fans while bathing or washing clothes to avoid the risk of explosion. As of September 2012 testing and discussion about the results was still ongoing. Eventually, in 2016, a study confirmed that chemicals used in fracking impact drinking water that is generated from wells.

Geography

Climate

According to the Köppen Climate Classification system, Pavillion has a cold semi-arid climate, abbreviated "BSk" on climate maps.

Demographics

2010 census
As of the census of 2010, there were 231 people, 95 households, and 64 families residing in the town. The racial makeup of the town was 93.1% White, 3.0% Native American, 0.4% Asian, 0.4% from other races, and 3.0% from two or more races. Hispanic or Latino of any race were 5.6% of the population.

There were 95 households, of which 30.5% had children under the age of 18 living with them, 49.5% were married couples living together, 11.6% had a female householder with no husband present, 6.3% had a male householder with no wife present, and 32.6% were non-families. 29.5% of all households were made up of individuals, and 16.8% had someone living alone who was 65 years of age or older. The average household size was 2.43 and the average family size was 3.02.

The median age in the town was 42.3 years. 23.8% of residents were under the age of 18; 6.5% were between the ages of 18 and 24; 23% were from 25 to 44; 28.2% were from 45 to 64; and 18.6% were 65 years of age or older. The gender makeup of the town was 48.9% male and 51.1% female.

2000 census
As of the census of 2000, there were 165 people, 77 households, and 50 families residing in the town. The population density was 861.2 people per square mile (335.3/km2). There were 89 housing units at an average density of 464.5 per square mile (180.9/km2). The racial makeup of the town was 93.94% White, 1.82% Native American, 0.61% from other races, and 3.64% from two or more races. Hispanic or Latino of any race were 2.42% of the population.

There were 77 households, out of which 23.4% had children under the age of 18 living with them, 54.5% were married couples living together, 9.1% had a female householder with no husband present, and 33.8% were non-families. 31.2% of all households were made up of individuals, and 15.6% had someone living alone who was 65 years of age or older. The average household size was 2.14 and the average family size was 2.69.

In the town, the population was spread out, with 21.8% under the age of 18, 9.1% from 18 to 24, 20.6% from 25 to 44, 32.7% from 45 to 64, and 15.8% who were 65 years of age or older. The median age was 44 years. For every 100 females, there were 96.4 males. For every 100 females age 18 and over, there were 84.3 males.

The median income for a household in the town was $33,125, and the median income for a family was $41,250. Males had a median income of $30,833 versus $19,167 for females. The per capita income for the town was $17,790. About 3.3% of families and 3.5% of the population were below the poverty line, including none of those under the age of eighteen and 7.1% of those 65 or over.

Education
Zoned campuses include Wind River Elementary School (grades K–5) and Wind River Middle/High School (grades 6–12).

Notable people
Matthew Fox, actor

References

Towns in Fremont County, Wyoming
Towns in Wyoming